Cabrini High School is an all-girls parochial high school in New Orleans, Louisiana. Cabrini is part of the New Orleans parochial school system.

The campus of Cabrini High School is located along Bayou St. John, near City Park and Esplanade Avenue.

Athletics
Cabrini High athletics competes in the LHSAA.

Its sports teams are known as the "Crescent".

References

External links

 Cabrini High School Official Website

Private middle schools in New Orleans
Private high schools in New Orleans
Catholic secondary schools in New Orleans
Girls' schools in Louisiana
Educational institutions established in 1905
1905 establishments in Louisiana